Necklaced laughingthrush may refer to:

Greater necklaced laughingthrush, a species of bird in the family Leiothrichidae
Lesser necklaced laughingthrush, a species of bird in the family Leiothrichidae